Pyaar Ka Punchnama is a 2011 Indian Hindi-language romantic comedy buddy film written and directed by newbie Luv Ranjan. The film stars Kartik Aaryan, Divyendu Sharma, Raayo S. Bakhirta, Nushrat Bharucha, Sonnalli Seygall and Ishita Raj Sharma and follows the story of three working bachelors who find girls whom they fall in love with and the twists and turns of the newly developing love stories. It was a sleeper hit at the box office, grossing  worldwide. A sequel Pyaar Ka Punchnama 2 was released on 16 October 2015.

Plot
Rajat "Rajjo" Mridul (Kartik Aaryan), Nishant "Liquid" Agarwal (Divyendu Sharma) and Vikrant Chaudhary (Raayo S Bakhirta) are working bachelors who live together in a flat in Noida.

Rajat falls in love with Neha (Nushrat Bharucha). Nishant falls for Charu (Ishita Raj Sharma) who is his colleague. She makes him do a good part of her work in an office and makes him foot her beauty parlor bills. He is too naïve to understand that she is only using him for financial assistance and moral support. Charu has a boyfriend, Abhi, but they aren't on the best of terms. Vikrant loves Rhea (Sonnalli Seygall) who can't get over her boyfriend of five years, Varun.

Rajat leaves the bachelor pad. Vikrant, however, is aware of Varun and knows that Rhea has not yet called off that relationship but he doesn't mind waiting because he is besotted. On her part, Rhea keeps assuring him that she will end the relationship but ends up sleeping with Varun while she is dating Vikrant.

Missing their meetings and bar-hopping, the trio decides to take a time-out by themselves. All three women, however, find out and decide to accompany them to the beach where they eventually mingle. Charu here kisses Nishant, while Rajat has a fight with Neha back at home. Charu starts to ignore Nishant and ends up eventually insulting him openly at work. Rajat and Neha eventually work out their differences but, soon after, further problems arise between them (such as Neha's constant tantrums). Rajat becomes so frustrated that he walks out on Neha, telling her that she is 'not worthy of him. Nishant goes into depression but is brought back to reality by his two friends Vikrant and Rajat who drive him to Charu's house. Nishant slaps Charu's boyfriend. Vikrant finds out that Rhea slept with her ex and leaves her.

In the end, the trio is seen sitting together, laughing and feeling happy with the moment they have with each other. In the end credits, the three women whom the trio fell for are shown having new boyfriends.

Cast
 Kartik Aaryan as Rajat Mridul aka Rajjo
 Raayo S. Bakhirta as Vikrant Chaudhary
 Divyendu Sharma as Nishant Agrawal aka Liquid
 Nushrat Bharucha as Neha 
 Sonnalli Seygall as Rhea 
 Ishita Raj Sharma as Charu
 Padam Bhola as Varun Bahl
 Ravjeet Singh as Abhijeet Sharda

Critical reception
Taran Adarsh of Bollywood Hungama gave the movie 3.5 stars out of 5, saying that "On the whole, Pyaar Ka Punchnama has a single-point plan of engaging and amusing the spectators by telling a story that is unusual, yet relevant. It's a radiantly good cinema that needs to be lauded and encouraged. Strongly recommended, go for it!"

Subhash K. Jha of Now Running gave 3.5 stars in a scale of 5, commenting that "Pyaar Ka Punchnama is a delightful rugged romantic-comedy."

Nikhat Kazmi of Times of India gave 3 stars out of 5, noting that "The film had promise and does have a few funny sequences. But by and large, it's a case of promises unfulfilled."

Blessy Chettiar of DNA India gave the movie 3 stars on a scale of 5, concluding that "The only problem with PKP is its running time. The second half seems never-ending, sappy and pleading for sympathy."

Swati Bhattacharyya of Daily Bhaskar gave 2.5 stars out of 5, saying that "It’s a youth-centric rom-com, watch it to see the contemporary take on love with twists and turns. Whether your relationship is a dangerous warning, if your brain can’t tell you at this moment, Pyaar Ka Punchnama will definitely give you an answer. It’s entertaining and fun-filled. Don’t go if you are expecting a conventional romantic movie as it may qualify to be blasphemous and a sex comedy."

Anupama Chopra of NDTV Movies gave 2 stars in a scale of 5, commenting that "Pyaar Ka Punchnama, starts out with some promise, echoing Dil Chahta Hai with a laid-back, buddy vibe but that evaporates as soon as the women appear."."

Shaikh Ayaz of Rediff gave the movie 2 stars on a scale of 5, concluding that "Pyaar Ka Punchnama is halfway funny but soon descends into a running commentary on why relationships with women are impossible and eventually wends its way to a very implausible end. It could have definitely done with some editing. If it were crisper, with more thought put into its script, situations, and dialogue, Pyaar Ka Punchnama would have made the cut."

Mayank Shekhar of Hindustan Times gave 2 stars out of 5, saying that "The movie acquires rhythms of a TV show, like so many do. We're already in the fifth season by the end of it. Though if this were a TV show, it'd be closest to an authentic Indian version of Friends, or How I Met Your Mother."

Rajeev Masand of CNN-IBN gave 1.5 stars in a scale of 5, commenting that "Disguised as a light-hearted comedy, Pyaar Ka Punchnama is such a film that you can't help but wonder if it was made by someone who's had his heart brutally stamped on by a woman."

Sonia Chopra of Sify gave 1.5 stars in a scale of 5, noting that "The film claims that men are victims."

Komal Nahta of Koimoi gave 1 star out of 5, concluding that "On the whole, Pyaar Ka Punchnama may be a moderate-budgeted film but its box-office prospects would be limited to a few cinemas in the cities because it is radically different from what the average cinemagoer is used to watching."

Box office
Pyaar Ka Punchnama was steady in several centres in second week.

Awards
 Pyaar Ka Punchnama was screened at the Indian Film Festival in Berlin and was widely appreciated by the audience.
 The film won the most successful small budget film award at the ETC Bollywood Business awards 2010.
 It got a roaring applause at a special screening in a director's cut section in October 2012, held at the annual cultural fest of IIT Kanpur, Antaragini 2012.
 4th Mirchi Music Awards: Upcoming Music Composer of The Year – Hitesh Sonik for "Baanwre" – Nominated

Soundtrack
All lyrics have been written by Luv Ranjan.

 "Life Sahi Hai"
Singers :- Benny Dayal, Vishal Dadlani, KK, Sid Cuotto; Composer :- Clinton Cerejo 
 "Chak Glassy"
 Singer :- Suzanne D'Mello; Composer :- AD Boyz
 "Baawre"
Singer :- Clinton Cerejo; Composer :- Hitesh Sonik
 "Koi Aa Raha"
Singer :- Suraj Jagan; Composer :- Hitesh Sonik
 "Ban Gaya Kutta"
Singer :- Mika Singh; Composer :- Luv Ranjan
 "Ishq Na Kariyo Kaake"
Singer :- Mika Singh; Composer :- Clinton Cerejo

See also
Pyaar Ka Punchnama 2, the sequel to the film

References

External links
 
 

2011 films
2010s buddy comedy films
2011 romantic comedy-drama films
Indian romantic comedy-drama films
2010s Hindi-language films
Films directed by Luv ranjan
Films scored by Clinton Cerejo
Films scored by Hitesh Sonik
Indian buddy comedy films
Viacom18 Studios films
2011 comedy films
2011 drama films